Pessina Cremonese is a comune (municipality) in the Province of Cremona in the Italian region Lombardy, located about  southeast of Milan and about  northeast of Cremona.

Pessina Cremonese borders the following municipalities: Cappella de' Picenardi, Gabbioneta-Binanuova, Isola Dovarese, Ostiano, Pescarolo ed Uniti, Torre de' Picenardi, Volongo.

Sikh Temple 
On 21 August 2011 a temple for the local Sikh community was inaugurated. The construction of the building with a space of 2352 square meters for 500 worshippers cost 1.3 million Euro. Further funds will be needed to erect the five golden cupolas of the temple. The Gurdwara follows Shri Guru Kalgidhar Singh Sabha. It is said to be the largest gurdwara in continental Europe (i.e. not including Britain, which has a large Sikh community).

References

Cities and towns in Lombardy